Brennan Philip Boesch (born April 12, 1985) is an American  former professional baseball outfielder. He made his Major League Baseball (MLB) debut in 2010 with the Detroit Tigers and won the American League Rookie of the Month Award the first two full months he was in the major leagues. He has also played in MLB for the New York Yankees, Los Angeles Angels, and Cincinnati Reds.

High school career
Boesch played high school baseball at Harvard-Westlake School in North Hollywood, Los Angeles. As a junior, Baseball America ranked him one of the top 25 prospects in the country. He won the World Wood Bat Championship as a member of Team Baseball America, was selected Best Hitter at the Area Code Games, Best Power Hitter at the Team One Nationals and won the Daily News Invitational Home Run Derby. In his senior year he batted .490 with seven home runs and was selected First Team All-CIF and a First Team High School All-American for the All-American Game.

College career
On the day University of California coaches came to scout him, Boesch swung at only three pitches – all for home runs. Highly recruited by professional scouts and colleges, Boesch chose the University of California, Berkeley, where he hit the ball out of the park in his first college at bat. Boesch played three years of college baseball at Berkeley from 2004 to 2006. He was awarded All-Pac-10 first team honors as a sophomore center fielder. He was the winner of the 2005 Clint Evans Award as the team's best hitter and co-winner of the team award for most valuable player. In 2005, he played collegiate summer baseball in the Cape Cod Baseball League for the Bourne Braves and the Brewster Whitecaps.

Professional career

Minor Leagues

Following his junior season, he was drafted in the third round of 2006 Major League Baseball Draft by the Detroit Tigers.

Boesch began his minor league career in 2006 with the short season Oneonta Tigers, where he was a NY-Penn League All-Star. With the Single-A West Michigan Whitecaps, in 2007, Boesch led all of Single A in RBIs and was third in hits. With the Double-A Erie SeaWolves, Boesch led the Eastern League in home runs (28) and won the MILB Round Trippers Award for leading all of AA in home runs, en route to his selection by Baseball America as Best Power Prospect AA. With the AA Seawolves, Boesch was named the Seawolves' Most Valuable Player, League Mid-Season All-Star, Post-Season All-Star, led the league in total bases and extra base hits. He finished fourth in runs scored and third in RBIs. Boesch also won a Gold Glove as he led the league with 15 outfield assists. Boesch was added to the Tigers 40-man roster and started the 2010 season with the Triple-A Toledo Mud Hens. After winning Tigers Minor League Player of the Month in his first month in AAA, Boesch was called to the Major Leagues on April 23, 2010.

Detroit Tigers

2010

The Tigers called up Boesch from the Toledo Mud Hens to replace the injured Carlos Guillén on April 23, 2010. Boesch made his major league debut the same day in a game against the Texas Rangers. Boesch hit a double off the left-field wall on the first pitch in his first major league at-bat.

Boesch hit his first major league home run—a grand slam off Los Angeles Angels pitcher Joel Piñeiro—on April 30. Coming in the same inning as Scott Sizemore's first career home run, it was the first time two Tigers had hit their first career home runs in the same inning since Pop Dillon and Kid Elberfeld did it in 1901.

Boesch was named the American League Rookie of the Month for May and June 2010 and Tigers Player of the Month in June. In his rookie season Boesch topped all American League rookies with 14 home runs and 67 RBIs. He finished fifth in the AL Rookie of the Year voting.

2011
After placing fifth in American League Rookie of the Year voting, Boesch's 2011 campaign began with him earning a starting position in the Tigers outfield. He started the season strong, leading the American League in June with 41 hits and a .380 batting average, but after establishing career bests with 75 runs scored, 121 hits, 16 home runs, and a .283 batting average, Boesch's season ended when he suffered a torn ligament in his hand in early August. It was the first time in his baseball career that Brennan had been sidelined by a serious injury.

2012
His 2011–12 off-season focused on a long post-surgery rehabilitation, and Boesch started the 2012 season slowly. He had his best month in July, when he hit .295, with 4 home runs and 17 RBIs. But after July, with his playing time reduced, Boesch completed his season with a .240 batting average, 12 home runs and 54 RBIs. Against the Chicago White Sox, in two key games during the pennant race, Boesch hit two game-winning home runs off Sox lefty Chris Sale, the only home runs Sale gave up all year to a left-handed batter.

Eligible for arbitration after three years of MLB service, the Tigers, in January 2013, signed Boesch to a one-year, $2.3 million contract for the 2013 season, but the Tigers also signed free agent All-Star outfielder Torii Hunter.

New York Yankees

2013
With Hunter lodged in right field, the Tigers released Boesch on March 13, 2013.  The very next day the New York Yankees offered Boesch a Major League contract.  In 23 games with the Yankees, Boesch hit .275 with 3 homeruns, and posted career highs with a slugging percentage of .529 and OPS of .831.  On two different occasions, May 8 versus the Colorado Rockies and May 25 versus the Tampa Bay Rays, Boesch delivered clutch game winning hits in the ninth inning.

While Boesch was on a rehab assignment in AAA recovering from a slight muscle tear, the Yankees released him in order to make room on the roster to replace the injured All-Star shortstop Derek Jeter with another infielder.

Boesch, a free agent going into the 2013 off season, played for the Escondigo Leones of the Dominican Republic Winter League where among other things he worked on sharpening his eye.  Boesch was among league leaders in bases on balls and showed no ill effects from the injury that sidelined him.

Los Angeles Angels

2014
On January 28, 2014, Boesch signed a minor league contract with the Los Angeles Angels. The contract included an invitation to spring training. On April 16, Boesch was called up and reached base on a fielding error on third baseman Josh Donaldson of the Oakland Athletics in his first plate appearance for the Angels. He was given a jersey numbered 00 – which he later called a distraction – and switched to No. 28.

The Angels designated Boesch for assignment on October 7, 2014. He elected free agency on October 9.

Cincinnati Reds

2015
On November 26, 2014, Boesch signed a minor league deal with the Cincinnati Reds. He elected free agency on November 4, 2015.

Boston Red Sox
Boesch signed a minor league deal with the Boston Red Sox in January 2016. He became a free agent after the season ended. He announced his retirement the following spring, on April 11, 2017.

Personal life
Boesch was born in Santa Monica, California. His father, Phil, is a prominent Los Angeles-area attorney with an office in Santa Monica. His mother, Vivian, is the operator of The Venice Beach House, a boutique hotel in Venice Beach, California. 

He married interior designer and former Fox Sports Detroit spokesperson Allison Ochmanek in November 2015. They divorced in September 2019.

Boesch is fluent in Spanish.

References

External links

Living people
1985 births
Baseball players from Santa Monica, California
Major League Baseball right fielders
Detroit Tigers players
New York Yankees players
Los Angeles Angels players
Cincinnati Reds players
California Golden Bears baseball players
Erie SeaWolves players
Harvard-Westlake School alumni
Leones del Escogido players
American expatriate baseball players in the Dominican Republic
Lakeland Flying Tigers players
Oneonta Tigers players
Toledo Mud Hens players
Bourne Braves players
Brewster Whitecaps players
West Michigan Whitecaps players
Scranton/Wilkes-Barre RailRiders players
Salt Lake Bees players